Oconee may refer to:

Places in the United States
Oconee, Georgia
Oconee, Illinois
Oconee, Nebraska
Oconee County, Georgia
Oconee County, South Carolina
Oconee River, Georgia
Oconee Township, Shelby County, Illinois
Oconee Township, Nebraska
Lake Oconee, Georgia

Other uses
 Oconee people, Hitchiti speakers that became part of the Seminole and Creek nations
 Oconee War, in Georgia, USA, 1780s–1790s
 Oconee Nuclear Generating Station, in South Carolina

See also
 Oconi, a branch of the Timucua tribe in southeastern Georgia